Andrea Giani (born 22 April 1970) is an Italian professional volleyball coach and former player who scored numerous successes in the 1990s, including three World Championships with his national team. He is considered one of the best volleyball players ever. He was an all-rounder able to play both as outside hitter and as middle blocker, but he played several times as opposite too.

Career
Giani’s father, Dario, was a rower who took part in the 1964 Summer Olympics for Italy. After having trained with the father, now a rowing coach, Andrea tried for brief period as a football player, in 1985 the 14-year-old Giani began his career as a volleyball player in the local team of Sabaudia, in the Southern Latium, where he lived. Soon news about his qualities spread and attracted attention from the two main volleyball club of Italy of the period: Panini Modena and Santal/Maxicono Parma.

Giani was chosen to play for the latter, initially with the junior team under Gian Paolo Montali as coach. Giani’s first final for scudetto in the Parma major team was in 1987. Parma was defeated, as well as in the following seasons.
Giani won in 1990 his first scudetto, it was to be followed by four more. In the meantime, in 1988, Giani had scored against Finland his first cap for the Italy, his career with the Azzurri colours ended in 2005 after a total of 474 caps (record), becoming one of the most renowned players in Italy and in the world for his excellent technical and jumping capabilities. With Italy Giani won three World Championship titles in a row (1990, 1994 and 1998) and four European Championship (1993, 1995, 1999, 2003) and many others. He won three medals at the Olympic Games but his team never won the gold medal, even though Italy was generally considered the top favourites.  He won silver medals at the 1996 Olympic Games and 2004 Olympic Games, and a bronze medal at the 2000 Olympic Games and make Golden time with team other members.
During his career Giani became renowned for his polyvalence, starting as a middle blocker, he turned into a  power attacker and passer. Giani before Modena, played in Parma 1985-1996 and winner three Italian Championship Serie A and Club World Championship.

After having quit the national team, Giani played for Cimone Modena until 2008 and winner two CEV Champions League. He taking the reins of the team as manager starting from season 2007–2008. His nickname is Giangio and at the season winner CEV Challenge Cup 2008.
Giani at 2009-2010 year won Championship Serie A2 with M. Roma Volley.
Giani became the manager of the Slovenia men's national volleyball team in May 2015. Few months later he led Slovenia to victory in the European Volleyball League, which secured them a spot at the 2016 FIVB Volleyball World League. In October Slovenia unexpectedly won their first medal on a major volleyball tournament, after reaching the Final of the 2015 Men's European Volleyball Championship where they were defeated by France.
In 2017, Giani replaced Vital Heynen as head coach of the Germany men's national volleyball team.

Honours

As a player
 CEV European Champions Cup
  1996/1997 – with Modena Volley
  1997/1998 – with Modena Volley

 FIVB Club World Championship
  Parma 1989 – with Maxicono Parma

 CEV Cup
  1987/1988 – with Maxicono Parma
  1988/1989 – with Maxicono Parma
  1989/1990 – with Maxicono Parma

 CEV Challenge Cup
  1991/1992 – with Maxicono Parma
  1994/1995 – with Maxicono Parma
  2003/2004 – with Modena Volley

 National championships
 1989/1990  Italian Cup, with Maxicono Parma
 1989/1990  Italian Championship, with Maxicono Parma
 1991/1992  Italian Cup, with Maxicono Parma
 1991/1992  Italian Championship, with Maxicono Parma
 1992/1993  Italian Championship, with Maxicono Parma
 1996/1997  Italian Cup, with Modena Volley
 1996/1997  Italian Championship, with Modena Volley
 1997/1998  Italian SuperCup, with Modena Volley
 1997/1998  Italian Cup, with Modena Volley
 2001/2002  Italian Championship, with Modena Volley

As a coach
 CEV Challenge Cup
  2007/2008 – with Cimone Modena
  2015/2016 – with Calzedonia Verona

Individual awards
 1994: FIVB World League – Most Valuable Player
 1995: FIVB World Cup – Most Valuable Player
 1998: FIVB World League – Best Blocker

State awards
 2000:  Knight of the Order of Merit of the Italian Republic
 2004:  Officer of the Order of Merit of the Italian Republic

References

External links

 
 
 Player profile at Volleyhall.org
 Coach/Player profile at Volleybox.net
 Player profile at LegaVolley.it   
 Coach profile at LegaVolley.it 
 
 
 

1970 births
Living people
Sportspeople from Naples
Italian men's volleyball players
Italian volleyball coaches
Olympic volleyball players of Italy
Olympic silver medalists for Italy
Olympic bronze medalists for Italy
Volleyball players at the 1988 Summer Olympics
Volleyball players at the 1992 Summer Olympics
Volleyball players at the 1996 Summer Olympics
Volleyball players at the 2000 Summer Olympics
Volleyball players at the 2004 Summer Olympics
Olympic medalists in volleyball
Medalists at the 2004 Summer Olympics
Medalists at the 2000 Summer Olympics
Medalists at the 1996 Summer Olympics
Mediterranean Games medalists in volleyball
Mediterranean Games gold medalists for Italy
Competitors at the 2013 Mediterranean Games
Competitors at the 1990 Goodwill Games
Goodwill Games medalists in volleyball
Italian expatriate sportspeople in Slovenia
Italian expatriate sportspeople in Germany
Italian expatriate sportspeople in France
Modena Volley players